Hits (stylised as ...Hits), released in 1998, is the first greatest hits album by English drummer and singer-songwriter Phil Collins. The collection included fourteen top 40 hits, including seven American number one songs, spanning from the albums Face Value (1981) through Dance into the Light (1996). One new Collins recording, a cover of Cyndi Lauper's "True Colors", also appeared on the collection and was a popular song on adult contemporary stations. Hits was also the first Phil Collins album to include four songs originally recorded for motion pictures (all of them US number-one hits) as well as his popular duet with Philip Bailey, "Easy Lover" (a UK number-one hit).

In 1998, the album reached number one in the United Kingdom and number 18 in the United States. It was reissued in 2008, following the usage of "In the Air Tonight" in a successful Cadbury advertisement campaign. On 4 August 2008, it became the number one album on the New Zealand RIANZ album chart. In July 2012, the album re-entered the US charts, reaching number six on the Billboard 200 when the album price was deeply discounted very briefly by Amazon.com. It has sold 3,429,000 in the US as of July 2012.

The compilation's cover features stylised versions of the cover art for Collins' first six albums, the collection's primary sources of songs.

Since the release of Hits there have been further compilations of Phil Collins songs. The Platinum Collection and Love Songs: A Compilation... Old and New were both released in 2004, while The Singles appeared in 2016. There have also been compilations released by the band Genesis, of whom Collins is a member (1975's Rock Theatre, 1999's Turn It On Again: The Hits and 2004's The Platinum Collection).

Track listing

Track notes
Track 1 features David Crosby on backing vocals.
Track 2 features Babyface on backing vocals, keyboard and drum programming, and Sheila E on percussion.
Track 3 features Philip Bailey on vocals.
Tracks 4, 11–13, 15 feature Daryl Stuermer on guitar. 
Track 6 features Eric Clapton on guitar.
Tracks 8, 13 feature Nathan East on bass. 
Track 9 features Marilyn Martin on vocals.
Track 16 features Peter Gabriel, Sting, and Helen Terry on backing vocals.

Personnel

Phil Collins – vocals (3–7, 9–10, 12, 14–15, lead on 1–2, 8, 11, 13, 16), keyboards (1, 6, 8, 11, 14–16), tambourine (4, 6), drums (1–9, 13–16), drum machine (11, 12, 15–16), kalimba (13), horn arrangements (13), all instruments (10), backing vocals (11, 13, 16), percussion (various tracks)
David Crosby – backing vocals (1)
Leland Sklar – bass (1, 11, 16)
Dominic Miller – guitars (1, 8)
Babyface – keyboards, drum programming and backing vocals (2)
Eric Rigler – Uilleann pipes (2)
Cornelius Mims – bass (2)
Michael Thompson – guitar (2)
Sheila E. – percussion (2)
Greg Phillinganes – acoustic piano and Wurlitzer (2)
Phil Bailey – vocals (3)
Daryl Stuermer – guitars (3–4, 8–9, 11–12, 15–16), lead guitar (13)
Nathan East – bass (3, 8, 13)
Lesette Wilson – keyboards (3)
John Giblin – bass (4, 15)
Peter Robinson – piano, glockenspiel and vibraphone (4)
Freddie Washington – bass (5)
Michael Landau – guitar (5)
Paulinho da Costa – percussion (5)
Eric Clapton – guitars (6)
Pino Palladino – bass (6)
Rob Mounsey – keyboards (7)
Arif Mardin – orchestra conductor (7, 9), string arrangements (11)
The Phenix Horns
Don Myrick – saxophone (8, 12), sax solo (11)
Louis Satterfield – trombone (8, 12)
Michael Harris – trumpet (12)
Rhamlee Michael Davis – trumpet (8, 12)
Arranged by Tom Tom 84 (8, 12)
Alex Brown – backing vocals (8)
Marva King – backing vocals (8)
Lynn Fiddmont – backing vocals (8)
Marilyn Martin – vocals (9)
Nick Glennie-Smith – keyboards (9)
David Frank – keyboards, bass, Mini Moog and Oberheim DMX (12)
Ronnie Caryl – rhythm guitar (13)
Brad Cole –  keyboards (13)
The Vine Street Horns
Andrew Woolfolk – saxophone (13)
Arturo Velsaco –  trombone (13)
Harry Kim – trumpet (8, 13), horn arrangements (13)
Daniel Fornero – trumpet (13)
Arnold McCuller – backing vocals (13)
Amy Keys – backing vocals (13)
Anne Dudley – orchestra conductor (14)
L. Shankar – violins (15)
Peter Gabriel – backing vocals (16)
Sting – backing vocals (16)
Helen Terry – backing vocals (16)

Charts

Weekly charts

Year-end charts

Certifications

References

1998 greatest hits albums
Phil Collins compilation albums
Atlantic Records compilation albums
Virgin Records compilation albums
Warner Music Group compilation albums
Albums produced by Phil Collins
Albums produced by Hugh Padgham
Albums produced by Babyface (musician)
Albums produced by Lamont Dozier
Albums produced by Arif Mardin